The Italian constitutional referendum took place on 4 December 2016. Opinion polling for the Italian constitutional referendum was ongoing in the months between the announcement of a referendum and the referendum polling day.

Opinion polls

Graphical summary

Polls

2016
2016 elections in Italy
Constitutional referendums in Italy